Santiago Guzmán (born January 11, 1989 in San Miguel de Tucumán, Argentina) is an Argentine rugby union player. He plays in the lock position. In May 2010, he was selected in a squad of over 40 players to represent Argentina in the two test Summer tour of Argentina. He has previously captained the Argentina U20 team.
He join the Stade Français (Paris) in June 2010.

See also
Argentina Rugby Union

References

Guzman Profile
Guzman Stats
irb.com
scrum.com
IRB Junior World Championships

External links
from irb.com
IRB Junior World Championships
scrum.com

1989 births
Argentine rugby union players
Living people
Argentina international rugby union players
Tucumán Rugby Club players
Pampas XV players
Stade Français players
Rugby union locks
Sportspeople from San Miguel de Tucumán